Little Queen may refer to:

Little Queen, a 1977 album by Heart
"Little Queen" (song), a 1977 song from the above album
Little Queen (manhwa), a comedy shōjo manhwa by Kim Yeon-joo

See also
"Little Queenie", a 1959 song by Chuck Berry